NGC 2023 is an emission and reflection nebula in the equatorial constellation of Orion. It was discovered by the German-born astronomer William Herschel on 6 January 1785.

This star-forming nebula forms part of the Orion B molecular cloud, or Lynds 1630, and is located in the northern section of this complex. In terms of stellar density, it is the poorest of the four clusters embedded in the cloud complex, with only 21 embedded infrared sources. The reflection nebula is illuminated by the Herbig Ae/Be star HD 37903, which has a spectral class of about B2 Ve. The region around the central star is radiating fluorescent molecular hydrogen emission at a near-infrared range. Infrared emission of polycyclic aromatic hydrocarbons has been detected from the nebula's dust.

Gallery

References

External links

 VizieR – NGC 2023
 NED – NGC 2023

Reflection nebulae
Orion (constellation)
Orion molecular cloud complex
2023
Discoveries by William Herschel
Astronomical objects discovered in 1785
Emission nebulae